José Recio Ariza (born January 24, 1957 in Fernán Núñez) is a Spanish former professional road racing cyclist. He won five stages at Vuelta a España and several Spanish stage races like Volta a Catalunya, Setmana Catalana de Ciclisme and Vuelta a Burgos.

Recio turned professional in 1980, and started in the Vuelta a Espana. This was not a success; he dropped out soon, stopped riding, and became a bricklayer for one year. In 1982, he returned as a professional rider, started the Vuelta again, and won a stage. 1983 also was good, as he won the Volta a Catalunya. In 1984, he was one of the leaders of his team in the Vuelta a Espana, and won a stage, finishing in the top ten overall.

References

External links

Living people
Spanish male cyclists
1957 births
Spanish Vuelta a España stage winners
Doping cases in cycling
Sportspeople from the Province of Córdoba (Spain)
Cyclists from Andalusia
People from Campiña Sur (Córdoba)